The Goddess – Music for the Ancient of Days is an album composed by John Zorn and released on the Tzadik label. It is the third in a series of albums, the first two being Alhambra Love Songs and In Search of the Miraculous.

Reception

Allmusic said  "This mystic celebration of the feminine is, like its previously released cousin, another of Zorn's more ambitious -- yet deliberate -- attempts at writing adventurous music that is at once accessible and arresting in its beauty".

Track listing
All compositions by John Zorn
 "Enchantress" – 7:44
 "Ishtar" – 5:36
 "Heptameron" – 5:17
 "White Magick" – 6:37
 "Drawing Down the Moon" – 5:49
 "Beyond the Infinite" – 11:51
 "Ode to Delphi" – 4:43

Personnel
Rob Burger - piano
Carol Emanuel - harp
Marc Ribot - guitar
Kenny Wollesen - vibraphone
Ben Perowsky - drums
Trevor Dunn - bass

References

2010 albums
John Zorn albums
Albums produced by John Zorn
Tzadik Records albums